
Gmina Miłosław is an urban-rural gmina (administrative district) in Września County, Greater Poland Voivodeship, in west-central Poland.

Villages
Apart from the town of Miłosław, Gmina Miłosław contains the villages and settlements of Bagatelka, Białe Piątkowo, Biechówko, Biechowo, Bugaj, Chlebowo, Chrustowo, Czeszewo, Czeszewo-Budy, Franulka, Gorzyce, Kębłowo, Kozubiec, Książno, Lipie, Mikuszewo, Nowa Wieś Podgórna, Pałczyn, Rudki, Skotniki and Szczodrzejewo.

Neighbouring gminas
Gmina Miłosław is bordered by the gminas of Dominowo, Kołaczkowo, Krzykosy, Nowe Miasto nad Wartą, Środa Wielkopolska, Września and Żerków.

References
Polish official population figures 2006

 
Miloslaw